Maximum Bob is a crime fiction novel by Elmore Leonard published in 1991. It was Leonard's 29th novel published under his own name.
The novel was adapted for a television series in 1998.

References

1991 American novels
American crime novels
Novels by Elmore Leonard
American novels adapted into television shows